Shadi Paridar (born 2 July 1986) is an Iranian chess player holding the title of Woman Grandmaster (WGM), who won Iranian Women Chess Championship four times. She won the Asian Under-16 Girls' Championship in 2002 in Tehran.

She played for Iran in the Women's Chess Olympiads of 2002, 2004, 2006, 2008 and 2010, and in the Women's Asian Team Chess Championships of 1995, 2003, 2005, 2008 and 2009.

References

External links

Shadi Paridar chess games at 365Chess.com

1986 births
Living people
Chess woman grandmasters
Iranian female chess players
Chess players at the 2010 Asian Games
Place of birth missing (living people)
Asian Games competitors for Iran
21st-century Iranian women